Millie and Christine McKoy (also spelled McCoy; July 11, 1851 – October 8, 1912) were African-American pygopagus conjoined twins who went by the stage names "The United African Twins" "The Carolina Twins", "The Two-Headed Nightingale" and "The Eighth Wonder of the World". The twins traveled throughout the world performing song and dance for entertainment, overcoming years of slavery, forced medical observations, and forced participation in fairs and freak shows.

Life
Millie and Christine (the "Carolina Twins") were born in Whiteville, North Carolina on July 11, 1851, to Jacob and Monemia McKoy who were enslaved by the blacksmith Jabez McKay. The McKay farm was near the town of Whiteville. Prior to the sisters' birth, their mother had given birth to seven other children, five boys and two girls, all of ordinary size and form. The twins were conjoined at the lower spine and stood at an approximately 90-degree angle to each other.

The twins were first sold at 10 months of age to South Carolinian John C. Pervis. Pervis and McKay reached an agreement where Pervis exhibited the girls for pay and then paid a percentage to McKay. Fourteen months after the original sale, they were sold to a showman, Brower, who had the backing of a wealthy merchant named Joseph Pearson Smith. Brower first exhibited the twins at North Carolina's first state fair, held in 1853. They were called "freaks of nature". The North Carolina State Fair was a success for Brower and the Carolina Twins; however, Brower's fortune changed over the next months. Brower was conned by a Texas adventurer, who offered land worth an estimated $45,000 as a purchase price for the twins. Brower accepted, sent the twins on to the Texan, and then waited several days for the deeds before realizing that he had been swindled. Brower returned to North Carolina to relate the loss to Joseph Pearson Smith. Since Brower was left destitute, Smith was given the promissory note and was now the owner of the Carolina Twins. Millie and Christine were handled by several managers before being reclaimed by Smith in Britain in 1857.

On January 1, 1863, the Emancipation Proclamation ended their slave status and they were no longer anyone's property. Before their emancipation, the girls had been showcased in fairs and freak shows in several U.S. cities and even Montreal, Canada.

Smith traveled to Britain to collect the girls and brought with him their mother, Monemia, from whom they had been separated. He and his wife provided the twins with an education and taught them to speak five languages, dance, play music, and sing. During their time in Britain, they met Queen Victoria. For the rest of the century, the twins enjoyed a successful career as "The Two-Headed Nightingale", and appeared with the Barnum circus, with Millie singing alto and Christine singing soprano To prove that they were really conjoined, they were also exhibited "without any infringement of modesty".

In 1869, a biography on the twins, titled History and Medical Description of the Two-Headed Girl, was sold during their public appearances. Joanne Fish Martell, former court reporter, discovered a memoir written by the girls at the age of 17 and used that and other sources to create her book Millie-Christine: Fearfully and Wonderfully Made, which was published in 2000. The twins' motto was "As God decreed, we agreed," and they strove to turn impediments into assets. As toddlers, they were clumsy and fell down quite frequently. They eventually developed a sideways walk that turned into a crowd-pleasing dance style. They were able to master keyboard duets with one soprano and one alto voice, and learned to harmonize.

When they were in their 30s, the twins moved back to the farm where they were born, which their father had bought from Jabez McKay and left to them.

On October 8, 1912, Millie and Christine died at age 61 of tuberculosis; Christine died 12 hours after her sister. They were buried in unmarked graves but in 1969 they were moved to a cemetery in Whiteville. Engraved on their tombstone were these words: "A soul with two thoughts. Two hearts that beat as one."

Biography
An undated and unsigned biography of the sisters was written around 1905. It includes events from their childhood, their kidnapping and movement to England, and finally their return to the United States and a bit of their life afterwards. The writing is only 22 pages long and contains letters from various physicians attesting to the genuine nature of the twins' conjoined physiology. At the end of the work, the girls answer the question as to whether they are one person or two, saying "Although we speak of ourselves in the plural we feel as but one person; in fact as such we have ever been regarded, although we bear the names Millie and Christina" (McKoy, 20).

Notes

References

  Thursday, June 29, 1882.

External links

 

Conjoined twins
1851 births
1912 deaths
20th-century deaths from tuberculosis
People from Whiteville, North Carolina
Sideshow performers
American twins
19th-century American slaves
Twin musical duos
19th-century African-American women
Tuberculosis deaths in North Carolina
20th-century African-American women